The H. Sylvia A. H. G. Wilks was a fireboat operated by the Fire Department of New York City.
The Wilks, and another fireboat, the Harry M. Archer, were both commissioned on January 17, 1958 built at the John A. Mathis Company shipyard. She cost $900,222.

The vessel's namesake donated $3 million to the Fire Department's Honor Emergency Fund.

The Wilks was taken out of service in 1970.

References 

Fireboats of New York City
1958 ships